West Township is one of fifteen townships in Effingham County, Illinois, USA.  As of the 2010 census, its population was 467 and it contained 175 housing units.

Geography

Extinct towns
 Gilmore

Cemeteries
The township contains these five cemeteries: Beck William, Besing, Faulk, Kavanaugh and Mahon.

Demographics

School districts
 Altamont Community Unit School District 10
 Effingham Community Unit School District 40
 St Elmo Community Unit School District 202

Political districts
 Illinois' 19th congressional district
 Illinois State House District 107; John Cavaletto (R), Salem, IL
 Illinois State Senate District 54; Kyle McCarter (R), Lebanon, IL
 Effingham County Board District G  (Doug McCain (R), elected 2014; term expires 2018)
 West Township elected officials elected on April 4, 2017, are: Township Supervisor, Scott A. Beal (R); Town Clerk, Iris Ashbaugh (R); Township Highway Commissioner, Mel Stuemke (R) ; Township Trustees: Wendell Alwardt (R), Mark Holland (D), Michael Runge (R), Bradley Suckow (R). Township official offices all expire in May 2021.

References
 
 United States Census Bureau 2007 TIGER/Line Shapefiles
 United States National Atlas

External links
 City-Data.com
 Illinois State Archives

Townships in Effingham County, Illinois
1860 establishments in Illinois
Populated places established in 1860
Townships in Illinois